Flippin is a city in Marion County, Arkansas, United States. The population was 1,345 at the 2020 census.

The city was named for the Thomas H. Flippin family and was incorporated in 1921. The Thomas H. Flippin Chapter of the Arkansas State Society, National Society United States Daughters of 1812, was named for the military service of SGT Thomas H. Flippin of Captain Hugh Brown’s Company, 1st Regiment, Kentucky Mounted Militia during the War of 1812.

Geography
Flippin is located in eastern Marion County north of US 412/62, in the Ozarks south of Bull Shoals Lake. US 412/62 leads southwest  to Yellville, the Marion county seat, and northeast  to Mountain Home.

Climate
The climate in this area is characterized by hot, humid summers and generally mild to cool winters.  According to the Köppen Climate Classification system, Flippin has a humid subtropical climate, abbreviated "Cfa" on climate maps.

Demographics

2020 census

As of the 2020 United States census, there were 1,345 people, 594 households, and 306 families residing in the city.

2000 census
As of the census of 2000, there were 1,357 people, 583 households, and 357 families residing in the city. The racial makeup of the city was 95.87% White, 0.44% Black or African American, 1.11% Native American, 0.29% Asian, 0.07% from other races, and 2.21% from two or more races.  0.81% of the population were Hispanic or Latino of any race.

There were 583 households, out of which 29.2% had children under the age of 18 living with them, 44.3% were married couples living together, 14.2% had a female householder with no husband present, and 38.6% were non-families. 33.4% of all households were made up of individuals, and 16.1% had someone living alone who was 65 years of age or older.  The average household size was 2.33 and the average family size was 2.99.

In the city, the population was spread out, with 27.9% under the age of 18, 8.7% from 18 to 24, 27.6% from 25 to 44, 20.0% from 45 to 64, and 15.8% who were 65 years of age or older.  The median age was 35 years. For every 100 females, there were 85.4 males.  For every 100 females age 18 and over, there were 74.5 males.

Economy
Ranger Boats was founded in and continues to operate out of Flippin. 

Ark-Plas, Diego's Fresh Mex, Micro Plastics, J&P Auto Sales, Wal-Mart, Flippin Public Schools, Marion County Government, Actronix, Parkview Pizza, NATCO, and Spirit Industries are top employers of Flippin citizens.  Located close to the White River, tourism plays a vital role in the Flippin economy.  Several resorts that feature trout fishing and lodging on the White River include: Cedarwood Lodge, Sportsman's Resort, Stetson's on the White, White Hole Resort and Wildcat Shoals Resort.

Education 
Public education for elementary and secondary school students is provided by the Flippin School District and its three schools including Flippin High School.

Infrastructure

Highways
 US 62/US 412
 U.S. Route 62 Business
 Highway 178
 Highway 202
 Airport Highway 980

See also 

 Flippin, Kentucky

References

External links

Cities in Arkansas
Cities in Marion County, Arkansas